South Tyrolean German (in the local Upper German (Bavarian) vernacular also referred to as "Südtiroulerisch" or "Sîdtiroul(er)isch") or Tyrolese is a dialect spoken in the northern Italian province of South Tyrol.
It is generally considered to be a local variant of Southern Bavarian, and has many similarities with other South German languages such as Austrian German. The difference between other Bavarian and South Tyrolean is the influence of Italian and Ladin in its lexicon.

Characteristics 
69.15% of the inhabitants of South Tyrol speak German as their mother tongue. South Tyrolean tends to be used at home or in informal situations, while standard German in its Austrian variant prevails at school, work and for official purposes. As such, this medial diglossia, since the spoken language is mainly the dialect, whereas the written language is mainly the Austrian German variety of Standard German.

The South Tyrolean dialect is related to Bairisch. It preserves its specific traits and is basically homogeneous with Northern Tyrolean variants. It absorbed some Italian or Italian-based terms, especially for administrative purposes (for example, driving license, General Practitioner, etc.) and some types of food. These terms are seldom present in Standard German or Austrian German.

Vocabulary

References 

German dialects
Culture of South Tyrol
Languages of Trentino-Alto Adige/Südtirol